SV Wilhelmshaven is a German association football club from Wilhelmshaven, Lower Saxony. SV Wilhelmshaven play in the Regionalliga Nord. SV Wilhelmshaven was founded in 1905. Since 1999, Wilhelmshaven's stadium is the Jadestadion.

History
Predecessor side SpVgg Wilhelmshaven was formed as FC Comet in 1905 and was quickly renamed FC Deutschland Wilhelmshaven. In 1912 this club was joined by Heppenser BSV, and later, in 1924, merged with VfB Wilhelmshaven to become Wilhelmshavener SV 1906.

In 1939, SV 06 merged with VfL 1905 Rüstringen to create SpVgg Wilhelmshaven. This side immediately won promotion to the first division Gauliga Niedersachsen, one of sixteen top flight divisions created in the re-organization of German football under the Third Reich in 1933. After the division was split in 1942, the club captured two consecutive titles in the newly formed Gauliga Weser-Ems in 1943 and 1944, but was unable to advance past the eighth-final round in the national playoffs.

In the aftermath of World War II, SpVgg was disbanded as were most other organizations in Germany, including sports and football associations. It was not until 1952 that the club was resurrected. In 1972, they were joined by TSV Germania to form an association under the current name SV Wilhelmshaven.

The combined club spent its first three seasons in the Regionalliga Nord (II)/2.Bundesliga Nord, but then fell to the third tier Amateur Oberliga Nord. SV was relegated to the Verbandsliga Niedersachsen (IV) for the first time in 1980 and since then has played as an elevator side moving between the third and fourth divisions.

In 1992, SVW merged with TSR Olympia Wilhelmshaven, but TSRs footballers left to play on their own on the local city circuit. SVW then had a brush with bankruptcy in 2000, and after being refused permission by the German Football Association for a merger that would have seen the return of Olympias footballers, was forcibly sent down in spite of a respectable finish well clear of relegation.

SV Wilhelmshaven performed well in the Oberliga Nord (IV) and a division championship in 2005–06 returned the team to the Regionalliga Nord (III), briefly ending a five-year stay in the fourth division. The club finished last there in the following season and returned to Oberliga play. SV enjoyed a successful 2007–08 campaign and, on the strength of a third-place finish, qualified for play in what will become the fourth division Regionalliga after the introduction of the new 3. Liga in 2008–09. It spent six seasons in the Regionalliga until 2014 when it was demoted to the tier six Landesliga Weser-Ems. The clubs suffered another relegation, now to the Bezirksliga, after the 2015–16 season.

FIFA lawsuit
SV Wilhelmshaven filed a lawsuit against FIFA, the international governing body of football, regarding the signing in 2007 of free transfer Sergio Sagarzazu. Sagarzazu played 38 times for the club over a year and a half. However, Sagarzazu's former clubs River Plate and Excursionistas filed for compensation in the amount of 157,000 Euros, which is allowed under FIFA's regulations. SV Wilhelmshaven refused to pay, claiming that such fees violated German law. FIFA demanded that the German FA deduct six points from Wilhelmshaven in the 2011–12 season. Despite this deduction, SV Wilhelmshaven managed to avoid relegation from the Regionalliga Nord.

FIFA imposed another six-point deduction in 2012–13 for lack of payment, but again, the club avoided relegation as two other teams went bankrupt. FIFA demanded that the German FA relegate SV Wilhelmshaven for lack of payment following the 2013–14 season. SV Wilhelmshaven filed suit against FIFA in German court to overturn the relegation order, stating that a German Court decision (from 2004) that the payment of training compensation was a restraint of trade under European law of free choice of employment meant that they did not have to pay such compensation. The club were relegated at the end of 2013–14. Months after, the Federal Court of Justice and Oberlandesgericht cleared SV Wilhelmshaven of any wrongdoing.

Honours
The clubs honours:
 Oberliga Nord Champions: 2006
 Verbandsliga Niedersachsen'
 Champions: 1994

Notable players
  Renato Bernardi Bauer
  Cyrille Florent Bella – played one game for the Cameroon national football team
  Jonathan Beaulieu-Bourgault – played for the Canadian national U-20 team at 2007 FIFA U-20 World Cup
  Riley O'Neill – played for the Canadian national U-20 team at 2005 FIFA World Youth Championship
  Christ Bongo – former member of the Congo national football team
  Rohan Ricketts - former Premier League, Football League Championship and Major League Soccer player & former member of the England national under-20 football team
  Heiko Bonan – former member of the East Germany national football team
  Dirk Schuster – former member of the East Germany and Germany national football team
  Mike Barten
  Fabian Lucassen  – played five games for the Germany U-19 team
  George Alhassan – former member of the Ghana national under-20 football team
  Iman Saghey Bi Ria – 6 Games and 2 goals for the Iran national football team
  Valdas Ivanauskas – former member of the Lithuania national football team
  Romanus Stonkus – former member of the Lithuania national football team who presented his country in twenty-one game and scores one goal
  Vidmantas Vysniauskas – former member of the who played two games for the Lithuania national football team
  Paweł Kryszałowicz – played in the FIFA World Cup 2002 with the Poland national football team
  Jozef Kotula
  Karol Praženica – played five games for the Slovakia national football team
  Richard Slezak
  Igor Bendovskyi – former Ukraine youth international
  Marcus Storey – played formerly in the US Major League Soccer
  Igor Krulj – former Swedish youth international and Allsvenskan

Former coaches
   Hans-Werner Moors (31.10.1999 – 30.06.2002)
   Wolfgang Steinbach (01.07.2002 – 04.04.2007)
   Kay Stisi (05.04.2007 – 07.09.2007)
   Ivica Josić (07.09.2007 – 14.09.2007)
   Predrag Uzelac (14.09.2007 – 22.09.2008)
   Boris Ekmeščić (23.09.2008 – 04.04.2009)

References

External links
Official team site
Abseits Guide to German Soccer

Football clubs in Germany
Football clubs in Lower Saxony
Association football clubs established in 1905
1905 establishments in Germany
Frauen-Bundesliga clubs

bg:Вилхелмсхафен